Round Mountain is a mountain in northwestern British Columbia, Canada, located  east of Dease Lake.

Round Mountain is a volcanic feature of the Northern Cordilleran Volcanic Province that formed in the past 1.6 million years of the Pleistocene

See also
List of volcanoes in Canada
List of Northern Cordilleran volcanoes
Volcanism of Canada
Volcanism of Western Canada

References

Two-thousanders of British Columbia
Volcanoes of British Columbia
Pleistocene volcanoes
Northern Cordilleran Volcanic Province
Subglacial mounds of Canada
Cassiar Land District